Natalya Sergeyeva (born May 3, 1976) is a Kazakhstani sprint canoe racer who competed from the mid-2000s. At the 2004 Summer Olympics in Athens, she was eliminated in the semi-finals of the K-2 500 m event while being disqualified in the heats of the K-1 500 m event. At the 2012 Summer Olympics she was eliminated in the semi-finals of the K-1 200 m. In the K-1 500 m she reached the B Final.

References

External links
Sports-Reference.com profile

1976 births
Canoeists at the 2004 Summer Olympics
Canoeists at the 2012 Summer Olympics
Canoeists at the 2016 Summer Olympics
Kazakhstani female canoeists
Living people
Olympic canoeists of Kazakhstan
Kazakhstani people of Russian descent
Asian Games medalists in canoeing
Canoeists at the 1998 Asian Games
Canoeists at the 2002 Asian Games
Canoeists at the 2006 Asian Games
Canoeists at the 2010 Asian Games
Canoeists at the 2014 Asian Games
Asian Games gold medalists for Kazakhstan
Asian Games silver medalists for Kazakhstan
Asian Games bronze medalists for Kazakhstan
Medalists at the 1998 Asian Games
Medalists at the 2002 Asian Games
Medalists at the 2006 Asian Games
Medalists at the 2010 Asian Games
Medalists at the 2014 Asian Games
Canoeists at the 2020 Summer Olympics
21st-century Kazakhstani women